The North African Cup of Champions was a tournament designed by the Union of North African Football (UNAF) that puts together the winners of the domestic leagues around North Africa. The tournament contains representatives from Algeria, Libya, Morocco and Tunisia.

History
On October 6, the representatives of the Federation of North African Football (FNAF) met in Tunis. They agreed that North Africa, once one of the strongest regions in African football, did not have a regional competition that represented the region. Therefore, the President of the FNAF, the Algerian Mohamed Raouraoua, along with the rest of the FNAF, decided that two new competitions would be started in order to bring together the best sides in North Africa. The Cup of Champions brings together the winners of the five domestic leagues in North Africa, whereas the Cup Winners' Cup matches the winners of the five domestic cup competitions around North Africa.

On 2011 The competition was cancelled because the Arab Spring revolutions. On 2015, the Union of North African Football decided to merge the competition with the North African Cup Winners Cup and created the UNAF Club Cup.

Format
The semi-finals and the final are two-legged affairs.

Prize money
Prize money:
 Champions: $150,000 
 Runner-up: $75,000 
 3rd Place: $35,000 
 4th Place: $35,000

Finals

Winners by team

Winners by country

All-time tables

2 points for win

Clubs

Countries

See also
 UNAF Club Cup
 North African Cup Winners Cup
 North African Super Cup
 North African Champions Cup - a similar North African competition in French colonial era.
 Maghreb Champions Cup - a similar North African competition in 1969 to 1975.

References

 
UNAF clubs competitions
International club association football competitions in Africa
Defunct international club association football competitions in Africa